Senator Millner may refer to:

F. Ann Millner (fl. 1980s–2010s), Utah State Senate
John Millner (born c. 1951), Illinois State Senate

See also
Senator Miller (disambiguation)